La Loche Airport  is located  south-east of La Loche, Saskatchewan, Canada.

See also 
List of airports in Saskatchewan
La Loche Water Aerodrome

References 

Registered aerodromes in Saskatchewan